Hawtree Creek is a small saltwater creek that empties into Jamaica Bay in Queens, New York. The creek separates the neighborhoods of Hamilton Beach and Howard Beach.

In the early 1900s, a canal was dug at the southern end of the creek to create Hawtree Basin. During colonial times, fishermen would build fishing shacks along its banks.

References

External links
 West Hamilton Beach

Rivers of Queens, New York
Rivers of New York (state)